The 43rd Cannes Film Festival was held from 10 to 21 May 1990. The Palme d'Or went to Wild at Heart by David Lynch.

The festival opened with Dreams, directed by Akira Kurosawa and closed with The Comfort of Strangers, directed by Paul Schrader.

Juries

Main competition
The following people were appointed as the Jury of the 1990 feature film competition:
Bernardo Bertolucci (Italy) Jury President
Aleksei German (USSR)
Anjelica Huston (USA)
Bertrand Blier (France)
Christopher Hampton (UK)
Fanny Ardant (France)
Françoise Giroud (France) 
Hayao Shibata (Japan)
Mira Nair (India)
Sven Nykvist (Sweden)

Camera d'Or
The following people were appointed as the Jury of the 1990 Camera d'Or:
Christine Boisson (actress) President
Bruno Jaeggi (journalist)
Caroline Huppert (director)
Catherine Magnan (cinephile)
Jan Svoboda (journalist)
Martine Jouando (critic)
Richard Billeaud
Vecdi Sayar (cinephile)

Official selection

In competition - Feature film
The following feature films competed for the Palme d'Or:

 Captive of the Desert (La captive du désert) by Raymond Depardon
 Come See the Paradise by Alan Parker
 Cyrano de Bergerac by Jean-Paul Rappeneau
 Daddy Nostalgie by Bertrand Tavernier
 Everybody's Fine (Stanno tutti bene) by Giuseppe Tornatore
 Hidden Agenda by Ken Loach
 Interrogation (Przesłuchanie) by Ryszard Bugajski
 Ju Dou by Zhang Yimou
 The King's Whore (La putain du roi) by Axel Corti
 Mother (Mat) by Gleb Panfilov
 Nouvelle Vague by Jean-Luc Godard
 Rodrigo D: No Future (Rodrigo D: No futuro) by Víctor Gaviria
 The Sting of Death (Shi no toge) by Kōhei Oguri
 Taxi Blues (Taksi-Blyuz) by Pavel Lungin
 Tilaï by Idrissa Ouedraogo
 Ucho by Karel Kachyňa
 White Hunter Black Heart by Clint Eastwood
 Wild at Heart by David Lynch

Un Certain Regard
The following films were selected for the competition of Un Certain Regard:

 1871 by Ken McMullen
 Abrahams Gold by Jörg Graser
 The Best Hotel on Skid Row by Christine Choy, Renee Tajima-Peña
 Black Rose Is an Emblem of Sorrow, Red Rose Is an Emblem of Love (Chyornaya roza - emblema pechali, krasnaya roza - emblema lyubvi) by Sergei Solovyov
 Canticle of the Stones (Le cantique des pierres) by Michel Khleifi
 Le casseur de pierres by Mohamed Zran
 Freeze Die Come to Life (Zamri, umri, voskresni!) by Vitali Kanevsky
 How Dark the Nights Are on the Black Sea (V gorode Sochi tyomnye nochi) by Vasili Pichul
 The Intended (Hameyu'ad) by Daniel Wachsmann
 Innisfree by José Luis Guerín
 The Last Ferry (Ostatni prom) by Waldemar Krzystek
 Longtime Companion by Norman René
 Night Out by Lawrence Johnston
 Pummarò by Michele Placido
 The Sacrament (Het sacrament) by Hugo Claus
 Secret Scandal (Scandalo segreto) by Monica Vitti
 Song of the Exile (Ke tu qiu hen) by Ann Hui
 The Space Between the Door and the Floor by Pauline Chan
 Tumultes by Bertrand Van Effenterre
 On Tour by Gabriele Salvatores

Films out of competition
The following films were selected to be screened out of competition:

 Artificial Paradise (Umetni raj) by Karpo Godina
 The Comfort of Strangers by Paul Schrader
 Cry-Baby by John Waters
 Dreams by Akira Kurosawa
 Korczak by Andrzej Wajda
 The Little Mermaid by John Musker, Ron Clements
 No, or the Vain Glory of Command (Non, ou a Vã Glória de Mandar) by Manoel de Oliveira
 The Plot Against Harry by Michael Roemer
 The Sun Also Shines at Night (Il sole anche di notte) by Paolo and Vittorio Taviani
 The Voice of the Moon (La voce della luna) by Federico Fellini

Short film competition
The following short films competed for the Short Film Palme d'Or:

 Le baiser by Pascale Ferran
 The Bedroom (De slaapkamer) by Maarten Koopman
 Jours de plaine by Réal Berard, André Leduc
 The Lunch Date by Adam Davidson
 Night Cries: A Rural Tragedy by Tracey Moffatt
 Les Pediants by Prinzgau
 Le pinceau à lèvres by Bruno Bauer Chiche
 Polvo Enamorado by Javier Lopez Izquierdo
 Portrét by Pavel Koutský
 Revestriction by Barthelemy Bompard
 To Be (Etre Ou Ne Pas Être) by John Weldon
  (His wife the chicken) by Igor Kovalyov

Parallel sections

International Critics' Week
The following films were screened for the 29th International Critics' Week (29e Semaine de la Critique):

Feature film competition

 Beyond the Ocean by Ben Gazzara (Italy)
 H-2 Worker by Stéphanie Black (United States)
 Mes cinémas by Füruzan et Gülsün Karamustafa (Turkey)
 Overseas (Outremer) by Brigitte Roüan (France)
 Queen of Temple Street by Lawrence Ah Mon (Hong Kong)
 The Reflecting Skin by Philip Ridley (United Kingdom)
 Time of the Servants by Irena Pavlaskova (Czechoslovakia)

Short film competition

 Animathon by Collectif (Canada) 
 Inoi by Sergey Masloboyshchikov (Soviet Union)
 Les Mains au dos by Patricia Valeix (France)
 The Mario Lanza Story by John Martins-Manteiga (Canada)
 Pièce touchée by Martin Arnold (Austria)
 Sibidou by Jean-Claude Bandé (Burkina Faso)
 Sostuneto by Eduardo Lamora (Norway)

Directors' Fortnight
The following films were screened for the 1990 Directors' Fortnight (Quinzaine des Réalizateurs):

 Alexandria Again and Forever (Iskindiriah Kaman Oue Kaman) by Youssef Chahine
 Bagh Bahadur by Buddhadeb Dasgupta
 Céllövölde by Arpad Sopsits
 December Bride by Thaddeus O'Sullivan
 End Of The Night by Keith McNally
 Halfaouine Child of the Terraces by Ferid Boughedir
 Inimene, Keda Polnud by Peeter Simm
 Laguerat by Georgi Djulgerov
 Margarit i Margarita by Nikolay Volev
 Metropolitan by Whit Stillman
 Paper Mask by Christopher Morahan
 Pervii Etage by Igor Minayev
 Open Doors (Porte Aperte) by Gianni Amelio
 Printemps Perdu by Alain Mazars
 Shimaguni Konjo by Fumiki Watanabe
 The Guardian Angel (Skyddsängeln) by Suzanne Osten
 Stille Betrüger by Beat Lottaz
 Swan Lake: The Zone (Lebedyne ozero. Zona) by Yuri Ilyenko
 To Sleep with Anger by Charles Burnett
 Time of Miracles (Vreme čuda) by Goran Paskaljevic
 Warsaw Bridge (Pont de Varsòvia) by Pere Portabella

Awards

Official awards
The following films and people received the 1990 Official selection awards:
Palme d'Or: Wild at Heart by David Lynch
Grand Prix: 
 Shi no toge by Kōhei Oguri
 Tilaï by Idrissa Ouedraogo
Best Director: Pavel Lungin for Taksi-Blyuz
Best Actress: Krystyna Janda for Przesłuchanie
Best Actor: Gérard Depardieu for Cyrano de Bergerac
Best Artistic Contribution: Gleb Panfilov for Mat
Jury Prize: Hidden Agenda by Ken Loach
Golden Camera
Caméra d'Or: Freeze Die Come to Life (Zamri, umri, voskresni!) by Vitali Kanevsky
Golden Camera - Special Mention: Time of the Servants by Irena Pavlásková & Farendj by Sabine Prenczina
Short films
Short Film Palme d'Or: The Lunch Date by Adam Davidson
 First Prize of the Jury: The Bedroom (De slaapkamer) by Maarten Koopman
 Second Prize of the Jury: Revestriction by Barthelemy Bompard

Independent awards
FIPRESCI Prizes
 Swan Lake: The Zone (Lebedyne ozero-zona) by Yuri Ilyenko (Directors' Fortnight)
 The Sting of Death (Shi no toge) by Kōhei Oguri (In competition)
 Special award: Manoel de Oliveira
Commission Supérieure Technique
 Technical Grand Prize: Pierre Lhomme (cinematography) in Cyrano de Bergerac 
Ecumenical Jury
 Prize of the Ecumenical Jury: Everybody's Fine (Stanno tutti bene) by Giuseppe Tornatore
 Ecumenical Jury - Special Mention: Hidden Agenda by Ken Loach & Taksi-Blyuz by Pavel Lungin
Award of the Youth
Foreign Film: Swan Lake: The Zone (Lebedyne ozero-zona) by Yuri Ilyenko
French Film: Printemps perdu by Alain Mazars
Other awards
 Prix de la Critique Internationale: The Sting of Death (Shi no toge) by Kōhei Oguri
Audience Award:
 Abraham's Gold by Jörg Graser
 Sur by Fernando Solanas

References

Media
INA: Arrival of the stars for the opening of the 1990 Cannes Festival (commentary in French)
INA: Presentation of the jury of the 43rd Festival (commentary in French)

External links

1990 Cannes Film Festival (web.archive)
Official website Retrospective 1990 
Cannes Film Festival Awards for 1990 at Internet Movie Database

Cannes Film Festival
Cannes Film Festival
Cannes Film Festival
Cannes